Omnium Gatherum are a Finnish melodic death metal band.

Omnium Gatherum may also refer to:
 Omnium Gatherum (play), by Theresa Rebeck, 2003
 Omnium Gatherum (album), by King Gizzard & the Lizard Wizard, 2022

See also